David Reed Richards (born April 11, 1966) is a former professional American football guard who played nine seasons in the National Football League (NFL).

A standout at Highland Park High School in Dallas, Texas, the 6-foot-5, 310-pound Richards was the first lineman to be named Parade Magazine's National High School Player of the Year in 1983.

In college, he was an All-Southwest Conference selection at guard as a sophomore at Southern Methodist University.  The following season, he earned All-SWC honors as a tackle at SMU.

Prior to his senior season, the NCAA placed SMU's football program on probation and Richards transferred to the University of California, Los Angeles, for his senior season.

A fourth-round selection of the San Diego Chargers in the 1988 NFL Draft, Richards spent five seasons with the Chargers (1988–1992), starting at right tackle (1988) and right guard (1989–92) in all 80 games.

In April 1993, Richards signed a three-year, $5.1 million agreement to play for the Detroit Lions.  He started 15 games at left guard for the Lions during the 1993 season before signing a two-year contract with the Atlanta Falcons in August 1994.  With the Falcons, Richards started 26 games during the 1994 and 1995 seasons.  In 1996, he started six games for the Falcons before he was released by the team.  He was claimed on waivers by the New England Patriots in October 1996.

Today, Richards lives in Dallas, where he works in commercial real estate.

References

1966 births
Living people
Sportspeople from Staten Island
Players of American football from New York City
American football offensive guards
SMU Mustangs football players
San Diego Chargers players
Detroit Lions players
Atlanta Falcons players
New England Patriots players